William Edward Sattler (August 9, 1916 – July 11, 1971) was an American professional basketball player. He played for the Youngstown Bears and Flint Dow A.C.'s in the National Basketball League and averaged 5.4 points per game. He died of a heart attack in his home on July 11, 1971, leaving behind a wife and four daughters.

References

1916 births
1971 deaths
American men's basketball players
Basketball players from Ohio
Centers (basketball)
Flint Dow A.C.'s players
Ohio State Buckeyes men's basketball players
Youngstown Bears players